Doris Cook [״Little Cookie״] (born June 23, 1931) is a former pitcher and outfielder who played from  through  in the All-American Girls Professional Baseball League.

Doris Cook joined the All-American Girls Professional Baseball League in 1949 at the age of 17, following in the footsteps of her older sister, Donna Cook, who played in the league from 1946 to 1954.

Born in Muskegon, Michigan, Doris was one of twelve children into the family of Sidney and Daisy (née Johnson) Cook. She played in a city softball league at age 14, before being scouted by the league under recommendation of her sister. She was signed a contract and relocated to the Springfield Sallies rookie team, a traveling developmental squad of the AAGPBL, which entertained crowds across the country, playing exhibition games before Major League Baseball contests.

Cook won her first game as a pitcher on the tour, which started in Chicago and ended up in Canada. She played in Yankee Stadium and Griffith Stadium. We traded autographed balls with Tommy Henrich of the Yankees, she recalled in an interview. From 1949 to 1950, she posted a 6–11 record in 17 pitching appearances and batted a 137 average (10-for-73).

In 1951 Cook was promoted to the Kalamazoo Lassies, playing for them two and a half years before joining the South Bend Blue Sox during the 1953 midseason. Paired with her sister Donna in South Bend, for the first time in her professional career, she retired from the league following the 1953 season.

Cook went 0–1 with a 5.74 earned run average in 22 games pitched and played 74 games at left field, while collecting a .128 batting average. I was more of a defensive player than an offensive one, she explained.

Following her baseball career, Cook worked in banking for more of two decades before retiring in 1994. Since 1988 she is part of Women in Baseball, a permanent display based at the Baseball Hall of Fame and Museum in Cooperstown, New York, which was unveiled to honor the entire All-American Girls Professional Baseball League. She also was elected to the Muskegon Area Sports Hall of Fame along with her sister Donna in 1993. She currently lives in her hometown of Muskegon.

Career statistics
Pitching

Fielding

Batting

Sources

All-American Girls Professional Baseball League players
Springfield Sallies players
Kalamazoo Lassies players
South Bend Blue Sox players
Baseball players from Michigan
Sportspeople from Muskegon, Michigan
1931 births
Living people
21st-century American women